Kim's Video and Music is a now-defunct video and music retail store in the East Village of Manhattan, New York City, described as the "go-to place for rare selections" and "widely known among the cognoscenti of new, experimental and esoteric music and film".  Its owner was Yongman Kim.

History
It opened at the site of Kim's dry cleaner business and eventually moved to its own location on Avenue A in 1987. It expanded to five other locations, including St. Mark's Place (Mondo Kim's) in the East Village, Kim's Underground at 144 Bleecker Street (on Laguardia Place), Kim's West (350 Bleecker Street & West 10th Street), and Kim's Mediapolis (2906 Broadway). By 2008, it had over 55,000 rental titles, many of which were rare or esoteric.

The original Avenue A location closed in 2004.  Mondo Kim's, to a lesser extent, also had a reputation for "ornery" service.

In June 2005, police raided Mondo Kim's, alleging they were selling bootlegs.

In September 2008, Kim announced he would be closing Mondo Kim's and giving away the film collection to anyone who could fulfill certain criteria, stipulating that the entire collection was to be taken intact and that Kim's members would continue to have access to the collection wherever it resided. In December 2008, it was reported that Salemi, Sicily had made a successful bid for the collection, as part of a village restoration effort.  In 2012, a Village Voice article entitled "The Strange Fate of Kim's Video" reported that the collection, though remaining intact, had essentially disappeared from public view after arriving in Salemi, and that the initiatives promised by Kim and the government of Salemi remained unfulfilled.

The last remaining location of Kim's Video & Music, located on 1st Ave, announced its closure on April 21, 2014.

On April 1, 2022, Kim's Video & Music was relaunched as Kim's Video Underground with the help of the Alamo Drafthouse theater chain. The new store is located in the lobby of Alamo's Lower Manhattan location in the Financial District of Manhattan, with the collection being relocated from Salemi back to New York. The store also now offers 5-day rentals for free.

Notable employees
Kim's was known for its staff, who were described by The Awl as "legendarily knowledgeable and haughty." Some of its employees later went on to successful careers in film, music, and the arts.
 Aurelio Valle, Musician, member of Calla
Isabel Gillies, actress, writer
Robert Greene, documentary filmmaker
Albert Hammond Jr., musician, member of The Strokes
Alex Ross Perry, director, screenwriter
Todd Phillips, director, producer, screenwriter
Christopher Pravdica, musician, member of Swans
Kate Lyn Sheil, actress<ref name="sheil">Tinkham, Chris. Kate Lyn Sheil's Video Past and Netflix Future. Interview'.'</ref>
Chris Vanderloo, founder of Other Music
Sean Price Williams, cinematographer
Andrew W.K., musician
Nick Zedd, filmmaker
Eric Copeland, musician and member of Black Dice
Michael M. Bilandic, filmmaker
Chris Ryan, editorial director at The Ringer
Kat Toledo, comedian and filmmaker 
Jody Avirgan, podcast host and producer 

References

Further reading
"The Strange Fate of Kim's Video", Village Voice'', September 12, 2012, accessed September 12, 2012.

East Village, Manhattan
Video rental services